Skog is a surname that may refer to 
Cecilie Skog (born 1974), Norwegian adventurer
Emil Skog (1897–1981), Finnish telephone worker, civil servant and politician
Harald Skog (born 1949), Norwegian Olympic boxer
Jan Erik Skog (born 1945), Norwegian electrician, trade unionist and whistleblower
Karin Lamberg-Skog (born 1961), Swedish cross-country skier
Laurence Skog (born 1943), American botanist
Nils Skog (1877–1964), Swedish sports shooter
Richard Skog, Norwegian strongman competitor
Sofia Skog (born 1988), Swedish association football player
Wea Skog (born 1938), South African cricketer

See also
 Skog (disambiguation)

Swedish-language surnames
Norwegian-language surnames
Toponymic surnames